Hendra Setijawan (born 20 April 1970) is an Indonesian archer. He competed in the men's individual event at the 1992 Summer Olympics.

References

1970 births
Living people
Indonesian male archers
Olympic archers of Indonesia
Archers at the 1992 Summer Olympics
Place of birth missing (living people)
Archers at the 1998 Asian Games
Asian Games competitors for Indonesia
20th-century Indonesian people